Elisabetta "Lisa" Mazzotti (born 16 July 1949) is an Italian voice actress who is affiliated with Associazione Doppiatori Attori Pubblicitari.

She is known for being the Italian dubbing voice actress to Naru Osaka (known as "Nina in the Italian dub) in the Sailor Moon anime franchise.

Dubbing roles
OVA anime
Iczelion - Black Iczel

Anime television
Sailor Moon - Naru Osaka (Nina)
Tonde Buurin - Keiko Kuroha (Heather Hogwarsh)
Transformers: The Headmasters - Phantom
X - Tokiko Magami

Television animation
Rupert - Rupert

Live action television
Goosebumps - Skipper Matthews (Dan Warry-Smith) (episode: "Attack of the Mutant Parts I & II")

Animated films
Balto II: Wolf Quest - Jenna
Balto III: Wings of Change - Jenna
The Ugly Duckling - Lady Mouse

References

External links
Lisa Mazzotti at Antonio Genna 

Living people
Place of birth missing (living people)
Italian voice actresses
Actresses from Rome
1949 births